The Kaibab squirrel (Sciurus aberti kaibabensis) is a tassel-eared squirrel that lives in the Kaibab Plateau in the Southwest United States, in an area of . The squirrel's habitat is confined entirely to the ponderosa pine forests of the North Rim of Grand Canyon National Park and the northern section of Kaibab National Forest around the town of Jacob Lake, Arizona.

This squirrel is not found anywhere else in the world. In 1965,  of Kaibab squirrel habitat within Grand Canyon National Park and Kaibab National Forest were declared the Kaibab Squirrel National Natural Landmark.

Description

Kaibab squirrels usually have a black belly (which is sometimes gray), white tail, tufted ears and chestnut brown head.

Ecology

The Kaibab squirrel lives in ponderosa pine forests, where it builds its nest out of twigs and pine needles. Kaibab squirrels, ponderosa pines, and the fungi which grow in the vicinity of the ponderosas exist in a symbiotic relationship. The squirrel eats acorns, fruit, and fungi (especially an underground truffle), as well as the seeds, bark, and twigs of the trees where it makes its home. The Kaibab squirrel's most significant source of food is the seeds found within ponderosa pine cones. Young squirrels are born between April and August.

In the past the Kaibab squirrel was given species status (Sciurus kaibabensis) but today is considered a subspecies of the Abert's squirrel, (Sciurus aberti).

The Kaibab squirrel is an example of evolution occurring through geographic isolation, but not because of the canyon. Compared to the Kaibab squirrel, the Abert's squirrel, with its several subspecies, has a much broader distribution and is found on the South Rim of the Grand Canyon. The difference between North Rim and South Rim Abert's squirrels has given rise to the commonly held but incorrect assumption that the canyon itself acted as a barrier preventing gene flow between the two populations. However, modern Kaibab squirrels are descended from populations of Abert's squirrels that dispersed into the Grand Canyon area following the last Ice Age.

As the climate warmed, ponderosa pine stands and the Abert's squirrels living there were limited to areas of high elevation like the Kaibab Plateau. These isolated populations eventually became modern Kaibab squirrels and, as the climate cooled again and ponderosa pines once again grew at lower elevations, other Abert's squirrel subspecies returned to the Grand Canyon area, filling in their former niches on the South Rim.

References

 "Evolutionary Genetics and Phylogeography of Tassel-Eared Squirrels (Sciurus aberti)" Trip Lamb, Thomas R. Jones and Peter J. Wettstein Journal of Mammalogy Vol. 78, No. 1 (Feb., 1997), pp. 117–133

External links
 Photographs of Kaibab squirrels in the wild
 Kaibab squirrel on YouTube

Sciurus
Squirrel, Kaibab
Endemic fauna of Arizona
Natural history of the Grand Canyon
Taxa named by Clinton Hart Merriam
Mammals described in 1904